In The Wings is a comedy written by Tony Award winner Stewart F. Lane. It was produced off-broadway at the Promenade Theater in New York city in 2005. Because the play is set in New York city in 1977, the costumes and sets become secondary characters. The off-broadway production included many bell bottoms, fringed vests and smiley faces. The play was first presented as a staged reading at The Revelation Theater starring Shannen Doherty and directed by Mr. Lane.

Plot synopsis
Two aspiring young actors, Melinda and Steve, in love with each other and the theatre get their big break when they are cast in a new musical by their Svengali-like acting teacher, Bernardo. But when the show moves to Broadway, only Melinda is asked to move with it. Their relationship is tested as well as their acting, singing and dancing skills. Steve's mother makes frequent visits to the couple's apartment with advice and money.

Opening night cast
 Lisa Datz - Melinda Donahugh
 Brian Henderson - Nicky Sanchez
 Josh Prince - Steve Leonards
 Peter Scolari - Bernardo
 Marilyn Sokol - Martha Leonards

Production credits
 Jeremy Dobrish - Director
 William Barclay - Set Designer
 Phil Monat - Lighting Designer
 Jill B C DuBoff - Sound Designer
 Pamela Edington - Production Stage Manager
 Liz Lewis - Casting
 Bonnie Comley - Producer

References
 Playbill article
 another Playbill article
 Playbill article Shannen Doherty

External links
official website
off-broadway listing

Off-Broadway plays
Plays by Stewart F. Lane